Nelson Antrim Crawford (May 4, 1888–1963), was an American writer, editor, professor, and publisher.

Biography 
Nelson Antrim Crawford was born on May 4, 1888 in Miller, South Dakota. He went to high school in Council Bluffs, Iowa. He edited the Kansas Industrialist from 1914 to 1925.

Crawford became the editor of Household magazine of Topeka, Kansas in 1928. He was the longtime editor of The Author & Journalist published in Topeka. He became its owner and editor with the October 1951 issue. He wrote several books, including The Ethics of Journalism (1924) and We Liberals (1936). He was the author of two novels, A Man of Learning (1928) and Unhappy Wind (1930).

Nelson Antrim Crawford House 

Nelson Antrim Crawford House (1938), was his residence located at 2202 SW Seventeenth Street in Topeka, Shawnee County, Kansas. It is listed on the National Register of Historic Places since 2017. It was designed by architect Floyd Orson Wolfenbarger.

Writings
The Ethics of Journalism (1924)
Cats Holy and Profane
Agricultural Journalism, Charles Elkins Rogers co-author

Poetry
The Carrying of the Ghost, (1923) B. J. Brimmer Company, Boston

Novels
 A Man of Learning (1928) 
Unhappy Wind (1930)

Articles
 Review of History of Journalism

References

1888 births
1963 deaths
Writers from Topeka, Kansas
American male novelists
American male poets
20th-century American poets
20th-century American novelists
American male journalists
American magazine editors
20th-century American newspaper editors
20th-century American male writers
People from Council Bluffs, Iowa
Editors of Kansas newspapers
People from Miller, South Dakota